"No-One But You (Only the Good Die Young)" is the final single recorded by the British rock band Queen. Recorded and released in 1997, six years after the death of lead singer Freddie Mercury, it is the only Queen recording to feature a three-piece lineup: guitarist Brian May (who wrote the song), drummer Roger Taylor, and bassist John Deacon. May and Taylor share lead vocals. The song was released on the album Queen Rocks and it was also released as a double a-side single with "Tie Your Mother Down". It was later included on the compilation album Greatest Hits III.

This song was also the last recording to feature John Deacon, who subsequently retired from public life, the last original Queen song to reach the Top 40 of some European countries and last original release from the band until 2014's Queen Forever.

Background
Brian May finished writing “No One But You (Only The Good Die Young)” in early 1997, after Queen reformed for a one-off appearance with Elton John at the Théâtre National de Chaillot in Paris. It was dedicated to Mercury and all those who die too soon. In 2019 on his Instagram page May revealed that it was during his visit to Montreux in 1996 to unveil a statue in Mercury's honour that he was first inspired to write the song. It was originally written for a potential May solo project, which eventually evolved into the album Another World. He sent the demo of the song to Roger Taylor, who by his own account put it in a drawer and forgot about it. After eventually hearing it, Taylor suggested that it could be turned into a Queen song. Taylor's contribution was to change the tempo and make the lyrics less specific to Mercury.

Music video 
The music video was produced by DoRo and filmed at Bray Studios, London on 29 October 1997. It was shot in black and white, and featured only the three remaining members of Queen in the studio.

A second version was also made, and is a completely different edit, featuring sepia-tinted footage of Mercury through all his years with the band. This version was featured on both Queen Rocks: The Video and Greatest Hits III VHS releases, both of which were released in 1998 and 1999, respectively.

Track listings 
7" Single

A1. "No-One But You (Only The Good Die Young)" - 4:13

A2. "We Will Rock You" (Rick Rubin Remix) - 4:59

B1. "Tie Your Mother Down" (Single Version) - 3:44

B2. "Gimme the Prize" (Instrumental Remix for 'The Eye') - 4:01

CD Single

1. "No-One But You (Only The Good Die Young)" - 4:13

2. "Tie Your Mother Down" (Single Version) - 3:44

3. "We Will Rock You" (Rick Rubin Remix) - 4:59

4. "Gimme the Prize" (Instrumental Remix for 'The Eye') - 4:01

Personnel 
Brian May - lead vocals on first and third verses, backing vocals, piano, electric guitar
Roger Taylor - lead vocals on second verse, backing vocals, drums
John Deacon - bass guitar

Chart positions

Kerry Ellis version

In 2002, Brian May worked with stage actress and singer, Kerry Ellis, to record an orchestral version of the song as it appears in the musical, We Will Rock You, where Ellis played the role of Meat. In the musical, it is sung by a woman, who after the ensemble have recalled the names of a number of musicians who died young, will culminate in saying the name "Freddie" as a tribute to Freddie Mercury. This version of the song was made only available to download on the official Queen website on 19 March 2005 and failed to chart. However, it was later included on her extended play Wicked in Rock and subsequently featured on her debut album Anthems.

In 2004, the Spanish stage actress and singer Eva María Cortés recorded the same orchestral version in Spanish to promote the Original Madrid Cast Recording of We Will Rock You.

Credits and personnel
Kerry Ellis – vocals
Brian May – writer, producer, arranger, piano, guitars, bass
Roger Taylor – drums (sticks)
Keith Prior –  drums (brushes)
Justin Shirley-Smith – co-producer, engineer, mixer
Kris Fredriksson – Pro Tools
Joshua J. Macrae – additional Pro Tools
Steve Price – engineer
Tom Jenkins – Pro Tools
Jake Jackson – assistant
Track recorded at Sphere Studios, Olympic Studios and Allerton Hill
Steve Sidwell – orchestra arranger and conductor
The London Session Orchestra – orchestra
Gavyn Wright – orchestra leader
Isobel Griffiths – orchestra contractor
Orchestra recorded at Air Studios, Lydhurst Hall

Notes

References 

1997 singles
Kerry Ellis songs
Parlophone singles
Queen (band) songs
1990s ballads
Rock ballads
Commemoration songs
Songs written by Brian May
Hollywood Records singles
British soft rock songs